The Pontificia Universidad Javeriana (English: Javeriana University) is a private higher education institution founded in 1623. It is one of the oldest, most traditional, and prestigious Colombian universities, directed by the Society of Jesus, with its main facilities in Bogotá and a second campus in Cali. "La Javeriana", as it is known by its students, has traditionally educated the Colombian elite. It is one of the 33 universities entrusted to the Society of Jesus in Latin America and one of 167 around the world.

The Javeriana University in Bogotá has 18 schools comprising 61 departments and 242 academic programs catering to areas of knowledge, giving the university its multidisciplinary nature. The Javeriana University in Cali offers 18 schools in four faculties. Its Law School recently received a high-quality accreditation by Resolution 6808 6 August 2010, of the Ministry of National Education. The campus in Cali has sectional divisions of the Bolsa de Valores de Colombia (BVC), Temple University's Fox School of Business, and others.

The university is one of the twelve universities in Colombia having a high-quality institutional accreditation, granted to it for eight years by Resolution 1320, 12 June 2003, of the Ministry of National Education.

The university has 21 undergraduate programs with high-quality accreditation, and eight programs in advanced stages of the accreditation process. In graduate programs, quality is acknowledged through the Qualified Registries. The university has 87 graduate programs with Qualified Registries and has presented another 29 to these processes. For the QS World University Rankings in 2023, the university was ranked #382 globally, #18 in Latin America, and #3 in Colombia.

History 

The College of the Society of Jesus was established in Santafé de Bogotá in 1604 as part of the San Bartolome School and Cloister. In 1623, the Audience and the Archbishop recognized the academic degrees conferred by the college. The students at that time received their degree, including Pedro Claver. That is the origin of what was known as the University and Academy of Saint Francis Xavier. In 1767, the Jesuits were expelled from the Spanish colonies, which closed the first stage of Universidad Javeriana's history.

Then 163 years after the university closed, an act of restoration was signed. In 1937 the School of Economics and Legal Sciences was founded, with the others following. In 1970, after multiple petitions from the community of Cali, the university started a program in that city. The Universidad Javeriana in Cali took the name of "Cali Branch", offering degrees in business, engineering, and psychology.

Campus

Main Campus in Bogotá 

The university's main campus has a total area of 445 acres (180ha) and approximately 202,988 spared meters of construction. Inside, there are a total of 45 buildings, 18 cafeterias, 1 university bookstore, a hospital, 1 parking block building with 1200 parking spaces, and 1 travel agency. The main campus is located inside the locality of Chapinero in eastern Bogotá since 1940. This campus borders important city landmarks such as the Parque Nacional Enrique Olaya Herrera to the south, the emblematic Carrera Séptima (seventh street) on the west end, the Eastern Hills (Bogotá) and the traditional Chapinero Block to the north. Today this university maintains its open campus environment that allows pedestrians to walk on the interior.
 
A brief history of some of the university's most emblematic buildings:
Most Buildings are named after previous presidents or deceased Jesuit Faculty members who were important members of the academic community.

1951: The university begins its modern development with the construction of the Edificio Emilio Arango, S.J., today this building is home to the university's central government and administration. 
1955: Hospital Universitario San Ignacio is built, home to the school of Medicine.
1954: The inauguration of the Edificio Félix Restrepo, S.J. alongside the programs of Bacteriology, Art and Decorations, Law, Nursing, Commerce, and Philosophy. 
1958: se inauguran los Talleres de Arquitectura.
1959: Female in-campus Housing facilities, which today is known as Edificio Carlos Ortiz, S.J.
1976: The Jesús María Fernandez, S.J. Building is open to the public. Today it houses the Main library named after Alfonso Borrero Cabal S.J.
1980 -1990 begins the new phase of development with buildings such as José Gabriel Maldonado, S.J. Building, home to the school of Engineering and all its departments. In 1991, the Gabriel Giraldo, S.J., custom made for The School of Law and The School of Political Science and International Relationships. In 1993, the Lecture room Building Fernando Barón, S.J. is built, and in 1996 the parking lot building with room for 1,200 vehicles.
2000: The university expands its physical development to the southeast with the Pedro Arrupe, S.J. Building where the School of Theology is located. Alongside this building there is also the Javeriana Centre for Sport Education (Gym, Sports and Training Facilities) and the Manuel Briceño, S.J. Building for The School of Psychology, The School of Social Sciences, and The School of Philosophy. 
In 2008: The university begins construction for "The Master Plan for The Development of The University's Infrastructure" alongside the very strict policy for ecological and environmental preservation. This plan includes the construction of the new Comparative Biology Building (2009), The Faculty of Arts Building (2014), the Jorge Hoyos, S.J. Building (now nicknamed "The Arc" for its peculiar architectural design) which opened in 2016, The ATICO Center (2009), one of the most technologically advanced buildings in Latin America for the Arts and Communication Studies (Atico is an acronym in Spanish for "High Technology, information, and computing"), The School of Engineering Laboratory Building (the tallest building on campus with a total of 15 floors) that opened its door in 2020, the new Science Labs Building, and the Continuing Studies off-campus Building in the northern part of the city which is still under construction. The master plan also includes the construction of a new and more modern Hospital, an auditorium capable of holding ceremonies with up to 1,800 people at once, the new School of Architecture and Design Building, and an expansion to the gym facilities to include an on-campus pool.

Cali Branch  

The Pontificia Universidad Javeriana of Cali is located to the south of the city, in Pance, next to Farallones de Cali, which are part of the Andes Mountain Range. It has a more rural ambiance where vegetation is abundant and is not rare to see local fauna. This promotes a safe and calm environment for the students. This campus has eight Buildings: Las Palmas, Guayacanes Building, Lecture Hall of The Lake, Administrative Offices, Samán Building, Almendros Building, Continuing Studies Building, Acacias Building, The Pink Cedar Building, and the Library. Currently, there are 2 more buildings under construction. It also has 5 cafeterias, a bookstore, parking lots, a center for the Colombian Stock Market, and a Subsidiary of the Fox School of Business from Temple University.

Academics 
The university offers 46 undergraduate programs and 179 graduate programs including, 94 professional specializations, 45 medical and surgical specializations, 8 dentistry specializations, 72 masters, and 13 PhDs.

Schools and departments 
 
 School of Theology
 School of Philosophy
 School of Medicine
 School of Dentistry
 School of Nursing
 School of Psychology
 School of Law
 School of Political Science and International Relations
 School of Arts: visual arts, performing arts, music
 School of Social Sciences: anthropology, history, literature, sociology, cultural studies
 School of Sciences: biology, mathematics and physics, microbiology, nutrition & biochemistry, chemistry
 School of Engineering: civil engineering, industrial engineering, electronic engineering, systems engineering, telecommunications engineering, mechanical engineering, mechatronics, bioengineering, data science
 School of Economics and Management Sciences: management, accounting, economy, finances.
 School of Education: child pedagogy, basic education emphasizing Spanish and human sciences
 School of Communication and Language: communication studies, information science, languages and linguistics
 School of Design and Architecture: architecture, industrial design, design of visual communication
 School of Environmental and Rural Studies: ecology, rural and regional development

Research 

The university has 61 departments and 14 institutes. Departments are academic units aimed at developing an area of knowledge through research, teaching, and the implementation of services such as continuing education, counseling, and advisory activities. Institutes are academic units responsible for research and consulting in areas requiring a special interdisciplinary approach.

To provide technological support to research, education, service and administrative processes, the university has next-generation network services. Mention can be made of the technological components available in the following units: The SIU (University Information System, acronym in Spanish) with its "People Soft" platform for Academic Management; the New Technologies-Aided Education Center (CEANTIC) that offers virtual courses support through its Blackboard platform; the Centro Audiovisual Javeriano, with front edge technology in this field in Latin America, internationally accredited like Autodesk Training Center-ATC; the Computer-Aided Architecture and Design Project, CAAD; the Technological Industrial Automation Center; the Geo-referenced Information Center, GIC; the Javeriana Center of Oncology; the San Ignacio University Hospital; and the Magnetic Resonance Imaging Center. It also has 130 laboratories and workshops.

La Javeriana is among the leading universities researching the Muisca people and culture.

Libraries 
 The Xavierian University has four libraries: The General Library, the Mario Valenzuela, S.J., Library, which specializes in philosophy and theology and is rated as the best in these disciplines in Latin America, the Alfonso Llano Escobar, S.J. Bio-ethics Library, and the CIRE (Centre for Ignatius Reflection and Exercises) Library. It has seven document and resource centers in the following fields of knowledge: bio-ethics, political science, architecture, psychology, law, insurance, social communication, and clinical epidemiology.

The library stock numbers 418,008 titles among books, magazines, journals, thesis and dissertation papers, music scores, maps, VHS and DVD film recordings, slides, sound videos, and sound recordings. The system has about 90 subscriptions to databases and has access to complete text contents for online consultation of journals, books, thesis and dissertation papers, and digital format slides.

It offers services such as the drafting of bibliographic references on specialized subjects and bibliographic exchange allowing data gathering that includes journal articles and other documents from libraries in Colombia and around the world. It serves the Javeriana community throughout a 24-hour schedule, Monday through Friday.

University Presidents and Executive Officers

Colonial Era University Presidents

Modern University Presidents

Current Executive Officers 
 Great Chancellor: Adolfo Nicolás, S.J.
 Vice Great Chancellor: Carlos Eduardo Correa Jaramillo, S.J.
 President: Jorge Humberto Peláez Piedrahita, SJ
 Provost: Luis David Prieto Martínez
 Vice President for University Welfare: Luis Alfonso Castellanos Ramírez, S.J.
 Vice President for Administration: Catalina Martinez de Rozo
 Vice President for Interinstitutional Relations: Luis Fernando Álvarez Londoño, S.J.
 Vice President for Research: Luis Miguel Renjifo
 General Secretary: Jairo Humberto Cifuentes Madrid

Cali Branch 

On 6 October 1970, responding to requests from the local community and the efforts of a group of practicing accountants who aspired to obtain the university degree, a Program of Public Accounting began in Cali. This was the origin of the Cali branch of the Javeriana University. On 20 November 1978 the board proposed the name Cali Branch, with headquarters in the capital under the same organization and higher authorities. The board of regents, at the request of the board, adopted the name Cali Branch. Today, this branch is one of the most prestigious universities in Cali.

The campus of the Pontificia Universidad Javeriana Cali is located in the south of the city, in Pance, at the foot of the Farallones de Cali, part of the Cordillera Occidental (Colombia), in a totally rural environment where vegetation and fauna abound. The campus consists of eight buildings (Las Palmas, Guayacanes, classrooms block, administration, Saman, Almendros, continuing education, and the recently opened Las Acacias). Two more buildings are being built on campus, which features five cafés, the Javeriana Shop, a large parking lot surrounding the entire campus, a branch of Corpbanca, a center of the Colombia Stock Exchange, and an MBA extension of Temple University Fox School of Business and Management. The campus also includes Alfonso Borrero Cabal auditorium; Central Library, one of the most complete in the Colombian Southwest; Loyola Sports Center; the office of entrepreneurship "Campus Nova", which fosters entrepreneurial talent within the university; and the Javeriano Writing Center, highly regarded for helping students develop writing skills.

The university has 35 research groups attached to the government Administrative Department of Science, Technology and Innovation; and a station, Javeriana Stereo FM 107.5 with a wide audience in the Colombian Southwest. It offers students opportunities in more than 87 countries and boasts 120 academic cooperation agreements with universities abroad.

Currently, the Pontificia Universidad Javeriana Cali offers 19 undergraduate programs of which eight have received quality accreditation by the Ministry of Education (Civil Engineering, Electronics Engineering, Industrial Engineering, Systems Engineering and Computer Science, Business Administration, Accounting law and Psychology). The law degree from the Pontificia Universidad Javeriana Cali is prestigious in Cali and the Colombian Suroccidente, profiting from one of the most complete moot courts for student practice. The Cali branch of the Faculty of Health Sciences inaugurated the Moot Hospital which has high-tech teams and a superior infrastructure for student interns.

In March 2012, the Pontificia Universidad Javeriana Cali received the Institutional Accreditation of High Quality from the Ministry of Education for eight years, placing it among the more competitive private universities in the country.

Alumni 
Javeriana's alumni include a vast range of prominent individuals in the history of the country and the region, with the following (non-exhaustive) list representative, including Presidents of Colombia, Vice Presidents of Colombia, National and International Ministers, Grammy Award-winning artists, Academy Award-nominated artists, Tony Award-nominated artists, Miss Universe, Olympic medallists and people included in Forbes and BBC lists.

 Camilo Prieto Valderrama, climate science professor and environmentalist.
 Ernesto Samper, President of Colombia (1994–1998)
 Daniel Samper Pizano, lawyer, journalist, and writer
 Daniel Samper Ospina, comedian, writer, journalist, and columnist
 Misael Pastrana, president of Colombia (1970–1974)
 Marta Lucía Ramírez, vice president of Colombia (2018–2022); 2021 Forbes list of the Colombian 50 most powerful woman
 María Juliana Ruiz, first lady of Colombia (2018–2022)
 Rodolfo Llinás, neuroscientist, University Professor at the New York University; Director of the Neurolab Research on the NASA and Ralph W. Gerard Prize laureate
 Luis Carlos Galán Sarmiento, politician
 Gustavo Bell, vice president of Colombia (1998–2002)
 Peter Claver, priest and missionary
 Ignacio Martín-Baró, scholar, psychologist, philosopher and jesuit priest
 Marcela Ocampo Duque, lawyer, Executive Manager Banco de la Republica
 Gustavo Petro, President of Colombia (2022-), left-wing politician; mayor of Bogotá (2014–2015) and member of the Colombian senate (2006–2010, 2018–2022)
 Vicky Colbert, Politician and Sociologist; 2017 BBC 100 Women
 Catalina Sandino Moreno, Academy Award-nominated actress
 Catalina Robayo, Miss Colombia 2010, placed Top 16 at Miss Universe 2011.
 Alejandro R. Jadad Bechara, physician, innovator, networker and humanist
 Henry Krieger, Broadway producer; Grammy Award-winning and Tony Award-nominated producer
 Ángela Robledo, psychologist, member of the Chamber of Representatives of Colombia
 Fernando Araújo Perdomo, former Minister of Foreign Affairs of Colombia (2007–2008)
 Noemí Sanín, former minister of Foreign Affairs of Colombia, former ambassador to the United Kingdom and Spain
 Óscar Iván Zuluaga Escobar, former Minister of Finance and Public Credit (2007–2010)
 Juan Carlos Pinzón, former minister of defense (2011–2015) and Ambassador of Colombia to the United States (2015–2017, 2021–)
 Gina Parody, former Minister of Education (2014–2016)
 Aurelio Iragorri Valencia, former minister of interior of Colombia (2013–2018)
 Claudia Blum, psychologist; former minister of foreign affairs (2019–2021)
 Natalia Abello Vives, former minister of transport of Colombia (2014–2018)
 Diego Molano Vega, former Minister of Information Technologies and Communications (2010–2014)
 Carlos Holguín Sardi, former minister of the Interior and Justice in Colombia (2006–2008)
 Juan Camilo Restrepo Salazar, former minister of agriculture and rural development of Colombia (2010–2013)
 Fernando Londoño, former minister of the interior and justice of Colombia (2002–2004)
 Juan Carlos Esguerra Portocarrero, former minister of justice and law of Colombia (2011–2012)
 Ricardo Velez Rodriguez, Brazilian Minister of Education
 Álvaro Gómez Hurtado, former Colombia Ambassador to the United States (1983–1985) and former Colombia ambassador to France (1991–1993)
 Jorge Franco, writer; Alfaguara Prize 2014
 Jorge Alfredo Vargas, news presenter
 Jorge Enrique Abello, actor; participated in Yo soy Betty, la fea, Betty en NY, iCarly and others
 Santiago Gamboa, writer
 Fonseca, singer; Grammy Award-nominated and Latin Grammy Award-winner artist
 Laura Tobón, model, beauty & fashion blogger
 Simón Brand, Hollywood director
 Vanessa de la Torre, journalist
 Riyad al-Maliki, minister of Foreign Affairs of Palestinian Authority
 Ignacio Martín-Baró, Spanish philosopher and psychologist
 Claudia Palacios, former anchor for CNN en Español
 Carlos Pizarro Leongómez, politician, commander of M-19 (dropped out)
 Mario Mendoza Zambrano, writer
 Fernando Vallejo, writer
 Paulina Dávila, actress
 Jackeline Rentería, Olympic medallist (2008, 2012)
 Kristina Lilley, American born-Colombian actress (She studied Biology before she became an actress).
 Paulina Vega, Miss Colombia 2013 and Miss Universe 2014; 2021 Forbes list of the Colombian 50 most powerful woman
 Giancarlo Mazzanti, architect
 Brigitte Baptiste, Environmental scientist and researcher, President of the EAN University and 2021 Forbes list of the Colombian 50 most powerful woman
 Ricardo La Rotta Caballero, architect
 Camilo Prieto Valderrama, surgeon and environmentalist 
   Diana Wiswell, actress.
 General Freddy Padilla De León, former commander of the Colombian Armed Forces, former Minister of Defense, ambassador

Lecturers 
 Miguel Gómez (photographer) (born 1974), Colombian / American photographer, worked in the Fine Arts department for several years.
 Carlos Serrano (born 1963), Colombian classical musician, worked for the music school.

See also 
 List of universities in Colombia
 List of colonial universities in Latin America
 List of Jesuit sites
 List of Muisca research institutes

References

External links 

 Pontificia Universidad Javeriana in Bogotá
 Pontificia Universidad Javeriana in Cali
 Postgraduate information

 
1623 establishments in South America
Educational institutions established in the 1620s
Jesuit universities and colleges
Pontificia Universidad Javeriana
Catholic universities and colleges in Colombia
Universities and colleges in Bogotá
1623 establishments in the Spanish Empire